is a former Japanese football player. She spent her entire professional career playing for clubs in the Nadeshiko League, and was a former international with the Japan women's national football team.

Club career
Niwata was born in Osaka Prefecture on September 12, 1984. In 2000, she was promoted to Speranza FC Takatsuki from youth team. In 2007, she moved to Urawa Reds. She retired end of 2012 season. She played 96 matches in L.League and she was selected Best Eleven 2 times (2009 and 2010).

National team career
In August 2002, Niwata was selected Japan U-20 national team for 2002 U-19 World Championship. On March 19, 2003, she debuted for Japan national team against Thailand.

National team statistics

References

External links

Urawa Reds

1984 births
Living people
Association football people from Osaka Prefecture
Japanese women's footballers
Japan women's international footballers
Nadeshiko League players
Speranza Osaka-Takatsuki players
Urawa Red Diamonds Ladies players
Women's association football midfielders